The 2020 Fight for the Fallen was the second annual Fight for the Fallen professional wrestling charity event produced by All Elite Wrestling (AEW). The event aired on TNT as a television special episode of AEW's weekly television program, Wednesday Night Dynamite. For the event's charitable cause, it helped to raise money for COVID-19 relief. The event took place on July 15, 2020, at Daily's Place in Jacksonville, Florida.

Production

Background
In June 2019, All Elite Wrestling (AEW) held a charity event titled Fight for the Fallen. All gate proceeds from the event were donated to victims of gun violence, which was a reference to the event's title. AEW and event sponsor Farah & Farah, a personal injury law firm located in Jacksonville, Florida, raised more than US$150,000 and the proceeds from the gate were donated to the Jacksonville Victim Assistance Advisory Council.

During Night 1 of Fyter Fest on July 1, 2020, it was announced that instead of airing on pay-per-view (PPV), the second Fight for the Fallen charity event would be broadcast as a special episode of AEW's weekly television program, Dynamite, on July 15. Due to the COVID-19 pandemic that began affecting the industry in mid-March, the event was held behind closed doors at Daily's Place in Jacksonville. Also due to the pandemic, it was announced that this second Fight for the Fallen event would raise money for COVID-19 relief, which would be added to the $1 million already donated by AEW President and Chief Executive Officer Tony Khan and his father Shahid Khan. As fans were unable to attend the event, AEW launched an online donation drive and released a limited-edition Fight for the Fallen t-shirt on ShopAEW.com with 100% of the proceeds benefiting Florida's First Coast Relief Fund and Feeding Northeast Florida.

Storylines
Fight for the Fallen featured professional wrestling matches that involved different wrestlers from pre-existing scripted feuds and storylines. Wrestlers portrayed heroes, villains, or less distinguishable characters in scripted events that built tension and culminated in a wrestling match or series of matches. Storylines were produced on AEW's weekly television program, Dynamite, the supplementary online streaming show, Dark, and The Young Bucks' YouTube series Being The Elite.

At Double or Nothing, the debuting Brian Cage won the nine-man Casino Ladder Match to earn a future AEW World Championship opportunity.  During the media scrum following Double or Nothing's broadcast, Tony Khan announced that Cage's championship match against Jon Moxley, who successfully defended the title against Mr. Brodie Lee that night, would main event Night 2 of Fyter Fest. After Moxley's wife, WWE employee Renee Young, had tested positive for COVID-19, the match was rescheduled for Fight for the Fallen due to possible secondhand exposure; Moxley later tested negative twice.

On July 13, Chris Jericho was announced as appearing in a non-wrestling role at the event.

Reception

Television ratings
Fight for the Fallen averaged 788,000 television viewers on TNT and a 0.29 rating in AEW's key demographic.

Results

See also
2020 in professional wrestling

Notes

References

External links
All Elite Wrestling Official website
Fight for the Fallen Official website

2020
2020 American television episodes
2020s American television specials
2020 in professional wrestling in Florida
Events in Jacksonville, Florida
Impact of the COVID-19 pandemic on television
July 2020 events in the United States
Professional wrestling in Jacksonville, Florida